Roland Victor Norris (1888 – 28 April 1950) was a biochemist and agricultural scientist who worked in India and Ceylon. He served as the first agricultural chemist to the government of Madras.

Biography 
He graduated from Manchester University and worked as an assistant to W.H. Perkin. He then worked at the Lister Institute of Preventive Medicine in London. In 1910 he worked with Professor Arthur Harden on yeast fermentation and received a D.Sc. from London University. In 1914 he took up the post of Physiological Chemist at the Imperial Bacteriological Laboratory in India. In 1918 he became the first Agricultural Chemist to the government of Madras. From 1924 to 1929 he worked as a professor of biochemistry at the Indian Institute of Science working on a range of agricultural problems including soil fertility, the chemistry of shellac and the spike disease of sandalwood. He moved to Ceylon in 1929 where he served as director of the Tea Research Institute.

He was married to biochemist Dorothy Norris who later worked at the Lac research institute in Ranchi, Jharkhand, India. He was married secondly to Wendy Elizabeth Marie and a daughter, Wendy Elizabeth Anne Jill, was born in Ceylon. He died in 1950 in Port Shepstone, South Africa.

Publications 
Norris' work in England was mostly on glycogen metabolism and yeast fermentation. After moving to India, he worked on a range of topics including human nutrition, soil nutrients and microbiological processes.

 
 
 
 
  [The inventor of the activated sludge process, Gilbert John Fowler was his predecessor at the Indian Institute of Science]
 Report on a Visit to Java [with plates, written by the chairman and the director] (1935). Colombo: Tea Research Institute of Ceylon.

Notes

References

External links 
Department of Biochemistry, Indian Institute of Science

1888 births
1950 deaths
English biochemists
Agricultural chemists
British people in the Colony of Natal
British people in British Ceylon
British people in colonial India